is a town located in Toyota District, Hiroshima Prefecture, Japan.

The Toyota District comprises a small island of the Geiyo Islands of the Seto Inland Sea, which separates Hiroshima Prefecture and Ehime Prefecture. Ōsakikamijima is the only town on the island. As of April 30, 2017, the town had an estimated population of 7,801 and a density of 180 persons per km². The total area is 43.24 km².

On April 1, 2003 the towns of Ōsaki, Higashino and Kinoe, all from Toyota District, merged to form the new town of Ōsakikamijima.

Education
Osaki Elementary School
Higashino Elementary School
Kinoe Elementary School
Ōsakikamijima Junior High School
Ōsaki Kaisei High School
Hiroshima National College of Maritime Technology

Recently, with the gradual migration of youth out of Osakikamijima, three of the elementary schools were combined to make Osakikamijima Elementary. All of the junior high schools were combined to make Osakikamijima Junior High.

References

External links

Ōsakikamijima official website 

Towns in Hiroshima Prefecture